Florin Mergea (born 26 January 1985) is a Romanian tennis player and a doubles specialist. He has reached the final of the ATP World Tour Finals in 2015 and won an ATP Masters title at the Mutua Madrid Open earlier that year. He achieved a career-high ATP ranking of World No. 7 in doubles (July 2015) and World No. 243 in singles (May 2005).

Coaching
His current doubles partner is fellow Romanian Adrian Barbu. Florin Mergea is presently coached by Alex Pop-Moldovan and managed by the McCartney Group, Vienna.

Tennis career

Juniors
As a junior Mergea compiled a singles win–loss record of 87–33, reaching as high as No. 2 in the world in July 2003 (and No. 1 in doubles). Along the way, he beat future top ten singles players like Andy Murray, Tomas Berdych, Gaël Monfils and Jo-Wilfried Tsonga.
As well as winning the Boys' Singles at Wimbledon in 2003 and being runner-up in the Boys' Singles tournament at the 2003 Australian Open, he won the Boys' Doubles in 2002 alongside compatriot Horia Tecău.

Seniors
The transition to the seniors tour proved difficult for Mergea. After turning pro in 2003, he struggled to make a breakthrough. Injuries hampered his career and in spite of reaching no. 103 in the doubles rankings, his lack of singles success and limited support drained his motivation. In 2010, Mergea decided to retire from tennis, a decision he turned around months later, with the help of his wife, Daiana. With renewed focus on the doubles game, his rankings rose steadily, playing alongside the likes of Andrei Daescu and Philipp Marx. After reaching thirteen challenger finals within little over a year, Mergea won his first ATP title in October 2013, when he teamed up with Lukas Rosol for the Erste Bank Open, Vienna.

Tour success continued in 2014, as he won the Royal Guard Open in Vina del Mar, with veteran Oliver Marach, and his first ATP 500 title at the International German Open in Hamburg, with Marin Draganja. Furthermore, siding with the Croatian, Mergea reached the French Open semifinal.

After starting 2015 with Dominic Inglot and reaching two finals, his injury plagued British partner needed time to recover. This gave way to the formation of his partnership with Rohan Bopanna, whom he had played with successfully at the Shanghai Masters the previous season. Together, they found consistency in their results, while winning the Madrid Masters and the Mercedes Cup in Stuttgart. In November, the team were the last to qualify for the ATP World Tour Finals. There, in spite of their seeding, they reached the final against the year-end No. 1 team of Mergea's Davis Cup and former juniors' partner, Romanian Horia Tecău, who played alongside Jean Julien Rojer.

He won the 2016 BRD Năstase Țiriac Trophy and the silver medal at the 2016 Olympic Games in Rio de Janeiro, alongside compatriot Horia Tecău.

In 2017 he won the title in Barcelona partnering with Aisam-ul-Haq Qureshi.

Significant finals

Year-end championships

Doubles: 1 (1 runner-up)

Masters 1000 finals

Doubles: 2 (1 title, 1 runner-up)

Olympic medal matches

Doubles: 1 (1 silver medal)

ATP career finals

Doubles: 15 (7 titles, 8 runners-up)

ATP Challenger and ITF Futures finals

Singles 13 (7 titles, 6 runners-up)

Doubles 77 (45 titles, 32 runners-up)

Doubles performance timeline

Current through the 2021 Antalya Open.

References

External links

 
 
 

1985 births
Living people
Sportspeople from Craiova
Romanian male tennis players
Wimbledon junior champions
Olympic tennis players of Romania
Olympic medalists in tennis
Olympic silver medalists for Romania
Tennis players at the 2016 Summer Olympics
Medalists at the 2016 Summer Olympics
Grand Slam (tennis) champions in boys' singles
Grand Slam (tennis) champions in boys' doubles